Lantis may refer to:

 Lantis (company), a now-defunct Japanese recording company
 Mazda Lantis, a car made by Mazda
 Lantis, a character in Magic Knight Rayearth